John Galsworthy  (14 August 1867 – 31 January 1933) was an English novelist and playwright. Notable works include The Forsyte Saga (1906–1921) and its sequels, A Modern Comedy and End of the Chapter. He won the Nobel Prize in Literature in 1932.

Life
Galsworthy was born at what is now known as Galsworthy House (then called Parkhurst) on Kingston Hill in Surrey, England, the son of John and Blanche Bailey (née Bartleet) Galsworthy. His family was prosperous and well established, with a large property in Kingston upon Thames that is now the site of three schools: Marymount International School, Rokeby Preparatory School, and Holy Cross Preparatory School. He attended Harrow and New College, Oxford. He  took a Second in Law (Jurisprudentia) at Oxford in 1889, then trained as a barrister and was called to the bar in 1890. However, he was not keen to begin practising law and instead travelled abroad to look after the family's trans-European shipping agency. During these travels, he met Joseph Conrad in 1893, then the first mate of a sailing-ship moored in the harbour of Adelaide, Australia, and the two future novelists became close friends. In 1895 Galsworthy began an affair with Ada Nemesis Pearson Cooper (1864–1956), the wife of his cousin Major Arthur Galsworthy. After her divorce ten years later, they were married on 23 September 1905 and stayed together until his death in 1933. Before their marriage, they often stayed clandestinely in a farmhouse called Wingstone that was in the village of Manaton on Dartmoor, Devon. In 1908 Galsworthy took a long lease on part of the building, and it was their regular second home until 1923.

Career
From the Four Winds, a collection of short stories, was Galsworthy's first published work in 1897. These and several subsequent works were published under the pen name of John Sinjohn, and it was not until The Island Pharisees (1904) that he began publishing under his own name, probably owing to the recent death of his father. His first full-length novel, Jocelyn, was published in an edition of 750 under the name of John Sinjohn—he later refused to have it republished. His first play, The Silver Box (1906),—in which the theft of a prostitute's purse by a rich 'young man of good family' is placed beside the theft of a silver cigarette case from the rich man's father's house by 'a poor devil', with very different repercussions, though justice was clearly done in each case—became a success, and he followed it up with The Man of Property (1906), the first book of a Forsyte trilogy. Although he continued writing both plays and novels, it was as a playwright that he was mainly appreciated at the time. Along with those of other writers of the period, such as George Bernard Shaw, his plays addressed the class system and other social issues, two of the best known being Strife (1909) and The Skin Game (1920).

He is now far better known for his novels, particularly The Forsyte Saga, his trilogy about the eponymous family and connected lives. These books, as with many of his other works, deal with social class, and upper-middle class lives in particular. Although sympathetic to his characters, he highlights their insular, snobbish, and acquisitive attitudes and their suffocating moral codes. He is viewed as one of the first writers of the Edwardian era who challenged some of the ideals of society depicted in the preceding literature of Victorian England. The depiction of a woman in an unhappy marriage furnishes another recurring theme in his work. The character of Irene in The Forsyte Saga is drawn from Ada Pearson, though her previous marriage was not as miserable as that of the character. The publishers William Heinemann were responsible for the publication of much of his work.

In 1924 he agreed to write a preface free of charge, to secure the publication of The Spanish Farm, the debut novel of family friend R. H. Mottram; the book was duly published by Chatto and Windus to great acclaim.

Causes and honours

Causes
Through his writings Galsworthy campaigned for a variety of causes, including prison reform, women's rights, and animal welfare, and also against censorship. Galsworthy was a supporter of British involvement in the First World War. In an article for The Daily News on 31 August 1914 Galsworthy called for war on Germany to protect Belgium. Galsworthy added "What are we going to do for Belgium — for this most gallant of little countries, ground, because of sheer loyalty, under an iron heel?"   During the First World War he worked in a hospital in France as an orderly, after being passed over for military service, and in 1917 turned down a knighthood, for which he was nominated by Prime Minister David Lloyd George, on the precept that a writer's reward comes simply from writing itself.

Galsworthy opposed the slaughter of animals and fought for animal rights. He was also a humanitarian and a member of the Humanitarian League. He opposed hunting and supported the League for the Prohibition of Cruel Sports.

Honours
Galsworthy was offered and refused a knighthood in 1918, but he was incorrectly stated to have received the knighthood because his letter to decline the knighthood was lost. Galsworthy was in 1921 elected to be the first president of the PEN International literary association. He was appointed to the Order of Merit in 1929. He was awarded the 1932 Nobel Prize for Literature, after his nomination by Henrik Schück who was a member of the Swedish Academy, and he donated the prize money from the Nobel Prize to PEN International. He was too ill to attend the Nobel Prize Ceremony on 10 December 1932, and he died seven weeks later.

Death
Galsworthy during the final seven years of his life lived at Bury, West Sussex, but he died from a brain tumour at his London home, Grove Lodge in Hampstead, and he was cremated at Woking, after which his ashes were scattered over the South Downs from an aeroplane. There are also memorials to him in Highgate (West) Cemetery and in the cloisters of New College, Oxford, that are by Eric Gill. The popularity of his fiction declined subsequent to his death, until the highly popular black-and-white television adaptation The Forsyte Saga (1967) increased public interest in his work.

A trove of John Galsworthy's letters and papers is held at the Special Collections of the University of Birmingham. A building at Kingston University, which was opened during 2007, and Galsworthy Road in Kingston, which is the location of Kingston Hospital, are named for him.

Family
Galsworthy's sister Lilian (1864–1924) was married to the German painter and lithographer Georg Sauter from 1894. With the beginning of World War I, Sauter was interned as an enemy alien at Alexandra Palace and later expelled. Their son Rudolf Sauter (1895–1971) was also a painter and graphic artist, who among other things, illustrated the works of his uncle.

Notable adaptations

The Forsyte Saga has been filmed several times:
 That Forsyte Woman (1949), dir. by Compton Bennett, an MGM adaptation in which Errol Flynn played a rare villainous role as Soames.
 The Forsyte Saga (1967 TV series), directed by James Cellan Jones, David Giles, starring Eric Porter, Nyree Dawn Porter, Kenneth More, and Susan Hampshire, 26 parts.
 The Forsyte Saga (2002 TV series), dir. by Christopher Menaul, starring Gina McKee, Damian Lewis, Rupert Graves, and Corin Redgrave, 13 parts.

The White Monkey was made into a silent film of the same name in 1925, directed by Phil Rosen, and starring Barbara La Marr, Thomas Holding, and Henry Victor.

The Skin Game was adapted and directed by Alfred Hitchcock in 1931. It starred C.V. France, Helen Haye, Jill Esmond, Edmund Gwenn, John Longden and Phyllis Konstam.

Escape was filmed in 1930 and 1948. The latter was directed by Joseph L. Mankiewicz, starring Rex Harrison, Peggy Cummins, and William Hartnell. The screenplay was by Philip Dunne.

One More River (a film version of Galsworthy's Over the River) was filmed by James Whale in 1934. The film starred Frank Lawton, Colin Clive (one of Whale's most frequently used actors) and Diana Wynyard, and featured Mrs. Patrick Campbell in a rare sound film appearance.

The First and the Last, a short play, was adapted as 21 Days, starring Vivien Leigh and Laurence Olivier.

Galsworthy's short story The Apple Tree was adapted into a radio play for Orson Welles's Lady Esther Almanac radio series on CBS, first broadcast on 12 January 1942; the play was again produced by Welles for CBS on The Mercury Summer Theatre of 6 September 1946. The 1988 film A Summer Story was also based on The Apple Tree.

The NBC University Theater aired radio adaptations of his plays Justice on 31 October 1948 and The Patrician on 26 February 1950.

The Mob, adapted by John Foley in 2004 for the BBC Radio World Service.

Works

The Forsyte Chronicles
 The Salvation of a Forsyte (The Salvation of Swithin Forsyte) (1900)
 On Forsyte 'Change (1930) (re-published 1986 as "Uncollected Forsyte")
 Danaë (1905–06) in Forsytes, Pendyces, and Others (1935)
 The Man of Property (1906) – first book of The Forsyte Saga (1922)
 The Country House,(1907)
 "Indian Summer of a Forsyte" (1918) – first interlude of The Forsyte Saga in Five Tales (1918)
 In Chancery (1920) – second book of The Forsyte Saga
 "Awakening" (1920) – second interlude of The Forsyte Saga
 To Let (1921) – third book of The Forsyte Saga
 The White Monkey (1924) – first book of A Modern Comedy (1929)
 The Silver Spoon (1926) – second book of A Modern Comedy
 "A Silent Wooing" (1927) – first Interlude of A Modern Comedy
 "Passers-By" (1927) – second Interlude of A Modern Comedy
 Swan Song (1928) – third book of A Modern Comedy
 Maid in Waiting (1931) – first book of End of the Chapter (1934)
 Flowering Wilderness (1932) – second book of End of the Chapter
 One More River (originally Over the River) (1933) – third book of End of the Chapter

Novels
 From the Four Winds, 1897 (as John Sinjohn)
 Jocelyn, 1898 (as John Sinjohn)
 Villa Rubein, 1900 (as John Sinjohn)
 A Man of Devon, 1901 (as John Sinjohn)
 The Island Pharisees, 1904
 Fraternity, 1909 
 A Motley, 1910
 The Dark Flower, 1913
 The Freelands, 1915
 A Sheaf, 1916
 Beyond, 1917
 Saint's Progress, 1919
 Captures, 1923
 The Burning Spear, 2002

Short Story Collections
 Villa Rubein and Other Stories, 1900 (as John Sinjohn)
 Five Tales, 1918 (Contents: "The First and Last", "A Stoic", "The Apple Tree", "The Juryman", and "Indian Summer of a Forsyte" (the first interlude of The Forsyte Saga)
 Tatterdemalion, 1920

Plays
 The Silver Box, 1906
 Strife, 1909
 Joy, 1909
 Justice, 1910
 The Little Dream, 1911
 The Patrician, 1911
 The Pigeon, 1912
 The Eldest Son, 1912
 The Fugitive, 1913
 The Mob, 1914
 The Little Man, 1915
 A Bit o' Love, 1915
 The Foundations, 1917
 The First and the Last, 1919
 The Skin Game, 1920
A Family Man, 1922
 Loyalties, 1922
 Windows, 1922
 Old English, 1923
 Escape, 1926
 Punch and Go, 1935

Essays
 Quality, 1912,
 The Inn of Tranquility, 1912,
 Addresses in America, 1912
 Two Essays on Conrad, 1930

Collected Works
 The Manaton Edition, 1923–26 (30 vols.)
 The Grove Edition, 1927–34 (27 Vols.)

Other works

 A Commentary, 1908
 A Justification for the Censorship of Plays, 1909
 The Japanese Quince, 1910
 The Spirit of Punishment, 1910
 Horses in Mines, 1910
 Moods, Songs, and Doggerels, 1912
 For Love of Beasts, 1912
 Treatment of Animals, 1913
 The Slaughter of Animals For Food, 1913
 Abracadabra, 1924
 The Forest, 1924
 Old English, 1924
 The Show, 1925
 Caravan: The Assembled Tales of John Galsworthy, New York: Charles Scribner's Sons 1925
 Verses New and Old, 1926 (poems)
 Castles in Spain, 1927
 Bambi, Mar 16, 1928, wrote the foreword to Felix Salten's now famous novel
 Exiled, 1929
 The Roof, 1929
 Soames and the Flag, 1930
 The Creation of Character in Literature, 1931 (The Romanes Lecture for 1931).
 Forty Poems, 1932
 Autobiographical Letters of Galsworthy: A Correspondence with Frank Harris, 1933
 Collected Poems, 1934
 The Life and Letters, 1935
 The Winter Garden, 1935
 Forsytes, Pendyces and Others, 1935
 Selected Short Stories, 1935
 Glimpses and Reflections, 1937
 Galsworthy's Letters to Leon Lion, 1968
 Letters from John Galsworthy 1900–1932, 1970

Notes and references

Further reading

External links

Digital editions
 
 
 
 
 The Forsyte Chronicles
 
 
 Plays by John Galsworthy on Great War Theatre
 
 List of Works

Biographical entries
 John Galsworthy at Oxford Dictionary of National Biography
 Interview with Galsworthy biographer Jeffrey Reznick on "New Books in History".
 John Galsworthy letters. Available online through Lehigh University's I Remain: A Digital Archive of Letters, Manuscripts, and Ephemera.
 

Physical collections
 The Papers of John Galsworthy at Dartmouth College Library

 
 

1867 births
1933 deaths
Alumni of New College, Oxford
Animal rights scholars
Animal welfare scholars
Anti-vivisectionists
British Nobel laureates
Neurological disease deaths in England
Deaths from brain cancer in England
English animal rights activists
English dramatists and playwrights
English humanitarians
20th-century English novelists
Presidents of the English Centre of PEN
Nobel laureates in Literature
People educated at Harrow School
People from Kingston upon Thames
English Nobel laureates
19th-century English non-fiction writers
Members of the Order of Merit
English male dramatists and playwrights
English essayists
English male novelists
19th-century male writers